Zephyranthes minuta is a plant species very often referred to as Zephyranthes grandiflora, including in Flora of North America. The latter is, however, an illegitimate name because the original author in coining the name Zephyranthes grandiflora listed the older name Amaryllis minuta as a synonym. This makes "minuta" the acceptable epithet under the ICN. In the UK it is a recipient of the Royal Horticultural Society's Award of Garden Merit.

Description

Zephyranthes minuta is a bulb-forming perennial with shiny green leaves up to 7 mm wide. Flowers in wild specimens are usually pink, funnel-shaped, up to 9 cm long. Cultivated specimens are frequently larger, often with extra tepals.

Distribution
Zephyranthes minuta is native to Mexico and Guatemala but widely cultivated as an ornamental and reportedly naturalized in Hawaii, the Andaman Islands, the islands of the Southwestern Caribbean (belonging to Colombia, Nicaragua and Honduras), and the southeastern United States (Texas, Louisiana, Mississippi, Georgia, Alabama and Florida).

Chemical composition

The following compounds are found in this plant: Pancratistatin, Zephgrabetaine, Lycorine, Galanthine, Lycoramine, Hamayne, Hamanthamine, Tortuosine, Ungeremin.

Gallery

References

minuta
Garden plants
Plants described in 1816
Flora of Mexico
Flora of Guatemala
Flora of Honduras
Flora of Nicaragua
Flora of Colombia